{{Infobox film
| name         = Run
|image            =Run_telugu.jpg
|caption          =poster
| writer          = 
| starring        = Sundeep KishanAnisha AmbroseBobby Simha
| director        = Anil Kanneganti
| cinematography  = B. Rajasekar
| based_on          = Neram by Alphonse Puthren| producer        = Sudhakar CherukuriKishore GarikipatiAjay Sunkara
| editing         = M. R. Varma
| country         = India
| released        = 
| runtime         = 110 min
| budget        = 
| music           = Sai Karthik
| gross        = 
| language      = Telugu
}}Run is a 2016 Indian Telugu-language black comedy thriller film directed by Anil Kanneganti and produced by Ajay Sunkara, Kishore Garikipati, and Sudhakar Cherukuri. It is the remake of Malayalam and Tamil bilingual Neram. The film features Sundeep Kishan and Anisha Ambrose in the lead roles, while Bobby Simha reprises his role as Vatti Raja from the bilingual film.  The film was released worldwide on 23 March 2016 to positive critical acclaim.

Plot
Sanju is a computer engineering graduate but lost his job. His life is a little complicated now because he has taken a loan from a predatory moneylender named Vatti Raja and is not able to repay the amount because he has no income.  Amu's father Srinivas denies her marriage with Sanju as he is jobless. Amu decides to elope with Sanju, and his friend Mani gives him the money for paying off his debt to Raja. On their way, Amu's chain is snatched, and Sanju's money is stolen. Raja calls Sanju and asks him to settle the money within 5PM.

Srinivas lodges a complaint with Sub-Inspector Padmavathi against Sanju on charges of kidnapping Amu and gives his number. Padmavathi calls Sanju and tells him that he should come along with Amu to the police station within 5PM, but problems are yet to come; Sanju's brother-in-law asks some amount of money from him to start a business by 5PM and sticks him with a restaurant bill that Mani again has to pay. On the other hand, Amu is kidnapped by Raja's men and stuffed in the dickey of his car after they assume she is the girlfriend of Manik, who also has to return money to Raja. With all these problems, Sanju is desperate for some solutions.

Sanju comes across Manik and decides to snatch his chain, but in a twist of fate he is hit by an auto and Sanju ends up saving him. At the hospital, Manik's brother Posani Balakrishna, a wannabe big shot, promises Sanju of a job in his company. He decides to kill the auto owner, which turns out to be Vaddi Raja, and takes an unwilling Sanju along. However, Padmavathi arrives and says that Raja died in an accident. A flashback reveals that Lighthouse (Shani Salmon), the man who stole Amu's chain and Sanju's money, had borrowed some money from Raja, too. He plots with two others in having the money for themselves and stealing Raja's car. While the plan works out perfectly, Raja's men went behind the car, and Raja goes behind the other man. In the chase, Raja is hit by an auto and dies; it turns out the driver had also been indebted to him and was told to cover up his non-working brakes, and was also the one who hit Manik.

Finally, Sanju meets the men who stole his money and involves in a brawl with them. He finds his money and Amu, who sees that the chain thief was also in Lighthouse's gang and finds her chain in the car. Sanju gives the money to his brother-in-law, and the movie ends with a happy note that "Time is of two types: good time and bad time. Good will come following every bad time in life".

Cast

 Sundeep Kishan as Sanjay "Sanju", a jobless computer science graduate who takes a loan from Vatti Raja
 Anisha Ambrose as Amulya "Amu", Sanju's love interest who elopes with him
 Bobby Simha as Vatti Raja, a private moneylender whom Sanju has to pay his debt to
 Y. Kasi Viswanath as Srinivas, Amu's father
 Posani Krishna Murali as Posani Balakrishna, Manik's brother who offers Sanju a job in his company
 Brahmaji as SI I. Padmavathi
 Praveen as Mani, Sanju's friend who gives him money for paying off his debt to Raja
 Mahat Raghavendra as Manikyam "Manik, Posani's brother who gets hit by an auto
 Shani Salmon as Lighthouse, a man who steals Amu's chain and Sanju's money and plots to steal Raja's car
 Madhunandan as Sanju's brother-in-law who wants Raja to give him money to start a business
 Ambati Srinivas as Auto Driver who hits Manik with his vehicle
 Surya as Money Borrower
 Sivannarayana Naripeddi as Doctor
 Fish Venkat as Posani's follower

Soundtrack

ReleaseRun was released on 23 March 2016 across Telangana and Andhra Pradesh coinciding with Holi Festival.

Reception
Y. Sunitha Chowdary of The Hindu  found that the movie was Set for a decent run.Hans India gave a rating of 3 out of 5 stars and stated that the film was an entertainer and worth watching once.123telugu.com'' gave the film 3 out of 5 stars and stated that the film was Different Thriller.

References

External links
 

2010s Telugu-language films
2016 films
Telugu remakes of Malayalam films
Telugu remakes of Tamil films
Indian comedy thriller films
2010s comedy thriller films
2016 comedy films
Films scored by Sai Karthik